Millcreek Township is one of eleven townships in Fountain County, Indiana, United States. As of the 2010 census, its population was 1,406 and it contained 815 housing units.

History
The Clinton F. Hesler Farm was listed on the National Register of Historic Places in 1989.

Geography
It contains the town of Kingman in the southwest along Indiana State Road 234. The unincorporated community of Centennial, with its cemetery of the same name, lies to the northeast on U.S. Route 41;  further north, at the intersection with Indiana State Road 32, lies Steam Corner. Harveysburg is north of Kingman and Yeddo is west of Centennial.

Education
Millcreek Township residents may obtain a free library card at the Kingman-Millcreek Public Library in Kingman.

References

 United States Census Bureau cartographic boundary files
 U.S. Board on Geographic Names

External links
 Indiana Township Association
 United Township Association of Indiana

Townships in Fountain County, Indiana
Townships in Indiana